Phnom Aural is the tallest peak in Cambodia. It is 1,813 meters tall (other sources give elevations ឪbetween 1,771 and 1,667 meters). 
It is in the eastern part of the Cardamom Mountains.

To protect the biodiversity of the mountains, Phnom Aural Wildlife Sanctuary was established in 1993.

This mountain in located in Aoral District, Kampong Speu Province.

See also
 List of Ultras of Southeast Asia
 List of elevation extremes by country

References

External links 
  by World Wide Fund for Nature(WWF)
Protected areas in Cambodia

Mountains of Cambodia
Cardamom Mountains
Geography of Kampong Speu province
Highest points of countries